In telecommunications, transmission is the process of sending or propagating an analog or digital signal via a medium that is wired, wireless, or fiber-optic. 

Transmission system technologies typically refer to physical layer protocol duties such as modulation, demodulation, line coding, equalization, error control, bit synchronization and multiplexing, but it may also involve higher-layer protocol duties, for example, digitizing an analog signal, and data compression.

Transmission of a digital message, or of a digitized analog signal, is known as data transmission.

Examples of transmission are the sending of signals with limited duration, for example, a block or packet of data, a phone call, or an email.

See also
Radio transmitter

References

Telecommunications engineering